Puya spathacea is a species in the genus Puya. This species is native to Bolivia.

Cultivars
 Puya 'Doris Coleman'

References

BSI Cultivar Registry Retrieved 11 October 2009

spathacea
Flora of Bolivia